Paul Bascomb ( – December 2, 1986) was an American jazz tenor saxophonist, noted for his extended tenure with Erskine Hawkins. He is a 1979 inductee of the Alabama Jazz Hall of Fame.

Career 
Bascomb was a founding member of the Bama State Collegians, which was led by Erskine Hawkins and eventually became his big band. Bascomb's brother Dud played in this ensemble. Bascomb remained in this ensemble until 1944, aside from a brief interval in 1938 and 1939, where he played in Count Basie's orchestra after Herschel Evans's death. From 1944 to 1947 he and Dud co-led a septet which evolved into a big band. He recorded for States Records in 1952; these sides were reissued by Delmark Records in the 1970s. From 1953 to 1955, he recorded for Parrot Records, and was active as a performer nearly up until the time of his death.

References

External links
 Official website of the Alabama Jazz Hall of Fame
 Bio of Paul Bascomb at Earthlink.net
 Another web bio on Paul Bascomb

1912 births
1986 deaths
Musicians from Birmingham, Alabama
American jazz saxophonists
American male saxophonists
Jazz musicians from Alabama
United Records artists
Delmark Records artists
Manor Records artists
20th-century American saxophonists
20th-century American male musicians
American male jazz musicians